Mongping or Möngping was the smallest state of the Shan States in what is today Burma.

History
Little is known about the history of this state except that in 1842 it was merged with Lawksawk. It was located at the southeastern end of that state, separated from it by the Nam Et River.

Rulers
1835 - 1842                Hkam Hlaing 
1842 - ....                Hkam Kaw

References

Shan States